Senator Barr may refer to:

Joseph M. Barr (1906–1982), Pennsylvania State Senate
Richard J. Barr (1865–1951), Illinois State Senate
Scott Barr (1916–2015), Washington State Senate
Thomas J. Barr (1812–1881), New York State Senate